Million Dollar Haul is a 1935 American mystery film directed by Albert Herman and starring Reed Howes, Janet Chandler and William Farnum.

Synopsis
The owner of a Los Angeles warehouse that has been robbed calls in a private investigator, who believes that they are an inside job and sets out to find the perpetrator.

Cast

References

Bibliography
 Pitts, Michael R. Poverty Row Studios, 1929-1940. McFarland & Company, 2005.

External links
 

1935 films
1935 mystery films
1935 crime films
American crime films
American mystery films
Films directed by Albert Herman
Films set in Los Angeles
1930s English-language films
1930s American films